St Joseph's Secondary School can refer to:

Ireland
 St Joseph's Secondary School, Spanish Point, County Clare, Ireland
 St Joseph's Secondary School, Tulla, County Clare, Ireland
 St Joseph's Secondary School, Castlebar, County Mayo, Ireland
 St Joseph's Secondary School, Navan, County Meath, Ireland

Elsewhere
 St. Joseph Secondary School (Mississauga) - Ontario, Canada
 Caritas St. Joseph Secondary School - Hong Kong
 Saint Joseph Higher Secondary School (Dhaka) - Bangladesh